Netdata is an open source tool designed to collect real-time metrics, such as CPU usage, disk activity, bandwidth usage, website visits, etc., and then display them in live, easy-to-interpret charts.

The tool is designed to visualize activity in the greatest possible detail, allowing the user to obtain an overview of what is happening and what has just happened in their system or application.

Overview
Netdata consists of a daemon that, when executed, is responsible for collecting and displaying information in real-time.

It is a lightweight tool, mostly written in C, Python, and JavaScript, which uses minimal resources: about 2% on a single-CPU system.

It can be run in any Linux system to monitor any system or application, and is capable of running on PCs, servers, and embedded Linux devices.

Features
Netdata is designed to be installed on a system without interrupting any of the applications running on it. It operates according to the memory requirements specified by the user, using only idle CPU cycles. Once the application begins, it will not perform disk I/O beyond logging. The tool saves to disk at the end of its execution and reloads at startup.

By default it contains certain plugins that collect key system metrics, but its behavior is extensible by using its plugin API.

Netdata can be run on virtually anything utilizing a Linux kernel and its graphics can be embedded into web pages. It has an interface with customizable themes and can be manually configured by the user, through simple HTML.

There are no dependencies, as it operates as its own web server, with static web files.

Starting with v1.12, Netdata collects anonymous usage information by default and sends it to Google Analytics, a feature which can be disabled via manual configuration.

Operation
When executing the daemon on Linux using the netdata command, threads are generated that collect information from each resource, using internal and/or external plugins. In turn, it keeps a record of the values collected in memory (without doing any Disk I/O).

It operates as a stand-alone web server for its own static files, necessary for the representation of 
its dashboards. It provides a REST API so that the browser can access the information.

Each installation of the application works autonomously. Although different running instances of the application can be saved to one dashboard, every Netdata instance is independent. Only the browser can connect all installations of different systems, unifying graphics from different sources as if they came from the same server.

Development 
Netdata is currently maintained by nearly 400 contributors, all helping (at various levels) to serve the thousands of individual users and businesses who utilize this tool.

The user with the most contributions is currently Costa Tsaousis, the CEO and Founder of Netdata, with over 600,000 additions to the code. The second most-active user is Ilya Mashchenko.

The all-time most popular addition to Netdata appears to be adding support for data collection from Vnstat, a pull request by Noah Troy with nearly 200 individual comments (more than any other pull request).

The all-time most popular feature request appears to be adding support for running multiple freeipmi jobs from the same Netdata.

See also
Comparison of dashboard software
Comparison of network monitoring systems

References

External links
 

Free and open-source software
System monitors